Prešnica is a village in the Municipality of Hrpelje-Kozina in the Littoral region of Slovenia.

The local church is dedicated to Saint Gertrude and belongs to the Parish of Klanec.

References

External links
Prešnica on Geopedia

Populated places in the Municipality of Hrpelje-Kozina